The 
IMPA Tu-Sa, (IMPA - Industrias Metalúrgicas y Plasticas Argentinas S.A.), named as Impa Tu-Sa-O in the Flight reference, was a civil trainer developed in Argentina in the 1940s for aeroclub use. It was a conventional, low-wing monoplane with wide-track fixed tailwheel undercarriage. In service, the aircraft demonstrated a number of serious and fundamental design flaws that led to a series of accidents and pilots joking that Tu-Sa stood for Todo Un Sarcófago Aéreo ("Altogether an aerial coffin"). When it became apparent that the defects could not be corrected without a complete redesign of the aircraft, they were withdrawn from use.

See also

References

Notes

Bibliography

 
 
 

1940s Argentine civil trainer aircraft
IMPA aircraft